The Douville River is a tributary of the Gatineau River by the Pain de Sucre Lake, flowing north of the Saint Lawrence River, entirely in the territory of La Tuque, in the administrative region of Mauricie, in Quebec, in Canada.

This stream runs entirely in a small valley in forest area. This area is without resort.

The surface of the Douville River is generally frozen from mid-December to the end of March.

Geography

Toponymy 
The term "Douville" is a family name of French origin.

The toponym "rivière Douville" was formalized on December 5, 1968 at the Commission de toponymie du Québec

See also

Notes and references 

La Tuque, Quebec
Rivers of Mauricie